William R. "Pickles" Kennedy (May 17, 1938 – August 31, 2006) was an American professional basketball player. He was a 5'11" (180 cm) 180 lb (82 kg) guard and played collegiately at Temple University. He played briefly in the National Basketball Association (NBA).

Career 
Kennedy was selected by the Philadelphia Warriors with the 15th pick in the 2nd round of the 1960 NBA Draft. He played seven games for the Warriors in the 1960-61 NBA season, averaging 1.7 points, 1.1 rebounds and 1.3 assists per game.

Personal life 
He died in 2006 in a car accident in Florida.

Career statistics

NBA

Regular season

Source

References

External links
William Kennedy NBA stats @ basketball-reference.com

1938 births
2006 deaths
All-American college men's basketball players
American men's basketball players
Philadelphia Warriors draft picks
Philadelphia Warriors players
Point guards
Temple Owls men's basketball players
Road incident deaths in Florida
Basketball players from Philadelphia